Croton capitatus, known as the hogwort or woolly croton or goatweed, is an annual plant with erect, branched stems, densely covered with light brown, wooly hairs that give it a whitish appearance. It grows in dry, open areas, especially sandy and rocky soils. It is distributed across the southern United States, and elsewhere.

Hogwort contains croton oil, a powerful laxative.

In fiction
British author J. K. Rowling did not deliberately name the Hogwarts School of Witchcraft and Wizardry from her Harry Potter series of books after the hogwort. It was only after the books were published, when a friend reminded her of seeing the plant in the Kew Gardens many years beforehand, that Rowling speculated that the name had remained in her subconscious ever since.

See also
List of Croton species

References

External links
Noble Foundation Hogwort page
Uvalde Research and Extension Center page on the Hogwort

Further reading
 

capitatus
Flora of the Southeastern United States
Flora of Texas
Flora without expected TNC conservation status